Furley is an English surname.

Notable people with the surname
Eileen Furley (1900–1985), first woman to represent the Liberal Party in the New South Wales Legislative
Matilda Furley (1813–1899), New Zealand storekeeper, baker, butcher, hotel-keeper and community leader
John Furley (1836–1919), English humanitarian
Oliver Furley (b. 1927), English historian and political scientist
Ralph Furley, fictional character on the sitcom Three's Company

As a given name
Philip Furley Fyson (1877–1947), British botanists and educator

See also 
Furley, Kansas is an unincorporated community in Sedgwick County, Kansas, United States
Furley, Bioextracts is a privately incorporated company in Semenyih, Selangor, Malaysia

References

Surnames of English origin